Southgate is a home rule-class city in Campbell County, Kentucky, United States. The population was 3,803 at the 2010 census.

History
The city of Southgate is named for the family of Richard Southgate. Born in New York City, Richard Southgate went to Newport from Richmond, Virginia in 1795. In October 1797, he was licensed to practice law in the court of Kentucky and appointed Commonwealth Attorney for Campbell County in 1798. He was State Representative in 1803 and Senator from 1817 to 1821. Richard died in July 1857 at the age of 83. Richard's home still stands on Third Street in Newport. His son William was a congressman from Northern Kentucky.

On May 28, 1977, the Beverly Hills Supper Club in Southgate was engulfed in fire, killing 165 inside.

Geography
Southgate is located at  (39.065611, −84.473638).

Demographics

At the 2000 census, there were 3,472 people, 1,601 households and 944 families residing in the city. The racial makeup of the city was 95.85% White, 0.72% African American, 0.26% Native American, 1.53% Asian, 0.69% from other races, and 0.95% from two or more races. Hispanic or Latino of any race were 1.24% of the population.

There were 1,601 households, of which 26.0% had children under the age of 18 living with them, 44.3% were married couples living together, 11.6% had a female householder with no husband present, and 41.0% were non-families. 35.7% of all households were made up of individuals, and 12.5% had someone living alone who was 65 years of age or older. The average household size was 2.17 and the average family size was 2.82.

21.7% of the population were under the age of 18, 8.0% from 18 to 24, 35.0% from 25 to 44, 20.7% from 45 to 64, and 14.7% who were 65 years of age or older. The median age was 36 years. For every 100 females, there were 87.0 males. For every 100 females age 18 and over, there were 80.8 males.

The median household income was $42,257 and the median family income was $53,365. Males had a median income of $37,846 compared with $27,634 for females. The per capita income for the city was $24,188. About 1.5% of families and 3.8% of the population were below the poverty line, including 4.6% of those under age 18 and 5.4% of those age 65 or over.

Notable people
 Jim Bunning – U.S Senator from Kentucky and Baseball Hall of Fame inductee

Media portrayals
 Part of the film Rain Man was filmed at Evergreen Cemetery in Southgate.

References

External links

 Historical Images and Texts of Southgate, Kentucky
 Southgate Volunteer Fire Department

Cities in Campbell County, Kentucky
Cities in Kentucky